Inna Berin is a Russian-American obstetrician and gynecologist, specializing in reproductive endocrinology and infertility at the Fertility Institute of New Jersey and New York.  Dr. Berin has authored several scientific publications in the field of reproductive endocrinology and infertility.

Life 

Dr. Berin received her MD from Mount Sinai School of Medicine in 2003, and then continued her professional training in OB/GYN residency at St. Luke’s-Roosevelt Hospita (now Mount Sinai Morningside)l of Columbia University College of Physicians and Surgeons, where she served as an Administrative Chief Resident and authored several papers dealing with infertility.

Reproductive Endocrinology and Infertility at Massachusetts General Hospital, Harvard Medical School, where she has authored several scientific publications and defended a thesis titled: Defining the role of Notch protein family members in progesterone production.  She was a recipient of the Dorothy Rackemann Fellowship of Vincent Memorial Hospital, Massachusetts General Hospital, Harvard University, for scholars in medicine.

Dr. Berin is a Certified Diplomate of The American Board of Obstetrics and Gynecology, and an attending physician at Hackensack University Medical Center, Valley Health System, and Holy Name Medical Center.  She is a Co-Medical Director, Reproductive Endocrinology and Infertility Specialist at the Fertility Institute of New Jersey and New York, in Oradell, New Jersey.

Scientific publications

Thesis 

 Inna Berin, Jill Attaman, Minji Kim, Aaron K. Styer, Ho Joon Lee, Hideo Sakamoto, Jason E. Bruemmer, David H. Townson, John Davis, Bo R. Rueda.  Defining the role of Notch protein family members in progesterone production.

Original articles

External links 
 Complete profile of Dr. Berin

References 

American gynecologists
American obstetricians
Living people
Year of birth missing (living people)